Ceratomyxa brayi is a species of myxosporean parasites that infect gall-bladders of serranid fishes from the Great Barrier Reef. It was first found on Cephalopholis boenak.

References

Further reading
Heiniger, Holly, and Robert D. Adlard. "Molecular identification of cryptic species of Ceratomyxa Thélohan, 1892 (Myxosporea: Bivalvulida) including the description of eight novel species from apogonid fishes (Perciformes: Apogonidae) from Australian waters." Acta Parasitologica 58.3 (2013): 342–360.

External links

Animal parasites of fish
Veterinary parasitology
Animals described in 2009
Ceratomyxidae